José Castillo (born 6 March 1911, date of death unknown) was a Cuban diver. He competed in the men's 3 metre springboard event at the 1948 Summer Olympics.

References

1911 births
Year of death missing
Cuban male divers
Olympic divers of Cuba
Divers at the 1948 Summer Olympics
Place of birth missing